Jawahar Lal Gupta was a former Chief Justice of the Kerala High Court.The High Court, headquartered at Ernakulam, is the highest court in the Indian state of Kerala and in the Union Territory of Lakshadweep.

Career
Gupta was enrolled as an advocate on 28 February 1963 and started practice in the Punjab and Haryana High Court. He was designated senior advocate in December 1982. While practising in the High Court he served as a part time teacher of the faculty at the Law College. Gupta was a member of Panjab University’s law faculty and member of the Board of Studies in Law. On 15 March 1991 he was elevated as an additional judge of the Punjab and Haryana High Court. In November 2002 he was appointed Chief Justice of the Kerala High Court and retired on 22 January 2004. During his tenure Justice Gupta delivered some landmark judgments. He was an eminent blogger and known as Bold Judge as a man without fear or favour. Justice Gupta died on 3 January 2016 at the age of 74 in Delhi due to cancer.

References

2016 deaths
Indian judges
Judges of the Punjab and Haryana High Court
Chief Justices of the Kerala High Court
20th-century Indian judges
20th-century Indian lawyers